Cristian Rubén Menin (born 7 January 1982 in Buenos Aires, Argentina) is an Argentine naturalized Italian former professional footballer who played as a forward.

Clubs
 Almagro 2001–2002
 Chacarita Juniors 2002–2014
 Quilmes 2004–2005
 Deportivo Armenio 2005–2006
 Rangers 2007
 Pro Vasto 2007–2008
 Massese 2008–2009
 Tre Fiori 2009–2011
 Cosmos 2011–2013
 Tre Penne 2013–present

Personal life
He is a cousin of Danilo Rinaldi and Federico Rinaldi.

References

External links
 
 

1982 births
Living people
Argentine footballers
Association football forwards
Argentine emigrants to Italy
Italian footballers
Italian expatriate footballers
Chacarita Juniors footballers
Deportivo Armenio footballers
Quilmes Atlético Club footballers
Club Almagro players
Rangers de Talca footballers
Primera B de Chile players
Argentine Primera División players
Argentine expatriate footballers
Expatriate footballers in Argentina
Argentine expatriate sportspeople in Chile
Expatriate footballers in Chile
Argentine expatriate sportspeople in Italy
Expatriate footballers in Italy
Argentine expatriate sportspeople in San Marino
Expatriate footballers in San Marino
Footballers from Buenos Aires